A School for Fools (tr. Shkola dlia durakov ) is a novel by soviet author Sasha Sokolov. The first draft of the book was completed in 1973 and distributed via samizdat. In 1975 a manuscript was submitted to Ardis Publishing. The book was published in the United States in 1976. For the annotation, a publisher, Carl Proffer, used compliments on the work from Vladimir Nabokov's letter. In 1977 Ardis issued the English edition, translated by Carl Proffer.

Plot 

The novel doesn't have a linear plot, but rather presents events as recalled by the main character. The protagonist, So-and-So, is a student who suffers from dissociative identity disorder and nonlinear time perception, which he believes he inherited from his grandmother. So-and-so is in a constant discussion with his "other self" and has difficulty distinguishing between "yesterday," "today," and "tomorrow."

The protagonist attends a school for special children, where he studies in a class taught by his favorite teacher, geographer Pavel Petrovich Norvegov whom the author also calls Saul Petrovich. He is also in love with another teacher, Veta. The accounts of their lives and the lives of some other minor characters highlight the reality of a repressive Soviet regime.

Following graduation, So-and-So goes on to work in a variety of jobs, from "sharpening pencils" to being a conductor. The narrative comes to an abrupt conclusion as the author runs out of paper.

Reception 

Wolfgang Kasack described the book as "the most surrealistic work of modern Russian literature."

Mikhail Berg stressed the importance of the Christian worldview in the work, noting the book's language and compositional peculiarities as an outstanding asset that originates directly from the peculiarities of the protagonist.

Mark Lipovetsky observed that A School for Fools directly follows Nabokov's literary tradition, opening the way to the most important and interesting phenomena of XXI century Russian prose, including works by Alexander Goldstein, Denis Osokin, Nikolay Kononov, Andrew Levkin, Alexander Ilianen, Stanislav Lvovsky, and others.

References 

Soviet novels
Censored books
Postmodern novels
1976 Russian novels
Novels set in Russia